The following outline is provided as an overview of and topical guide to production:

Production – act of creating 'use' value or 'utility' that can satisfy a want or need. The act may or may not include factors of production other than labor.  Any effort directed toward the realization of a desired product or service is a "productive" effort and the performance of such act is production.

The following outline is provided as an overview of and topical guide to production:

Types 
 Industry – production of an economic good or service within an economy.  Industry is divided into four sectors, or types of production; they are:

Primary sector 
 Primary sector – this involves the extraction of resources directly from the Earth, this includes agricultural and resource extraction industries. In these industries, the product (that is, the focus of production) is a natural resource.
 Agriculture   (outline) – cultivation of animals, plants, fungi, and other life forms for food, fiber, and other products used to sustain life.
 Animal husbandry – agricultural practice of breeding and raising livestock.
 Farming – cultivating land for the purpose of agricultural production.
 Aquaculture – the farming of fish, crustaceans, molluscs, aquatic plants, algae, and other aquatic organisms.
 Forestry   (outline) – creating, managing, using, and conserving forests and associated resources in a sustainable manner to meet desired goals, needs, and values for human benefit.
 Resource extraction –
 Fishing – activity of catching or harvesting fish and other aquatic animals such as molluscs, cephalopods, crustaceans, and echinoderms.
 Logging – harvesting timber, including cutting, skidding, on-site processing, and loading trees or logs onto trucks or skeleton cars.
 Mining   (outline) – extraction of valuable minerals or other geological materials from the earth, from an ore body, vein or (coal) seam.
 Extraction of petroleum – process by which usable petroleum (oil) is extracted and removed from the earth.
 Extraction of natural gas – Natural gas is commercially extracted from oil fields and natural gas fields.
 Water industry – provides drinking water to residential, commercial, and industrial sectors of the economy.

Secondary sector 
 Secondary sector – involves the processing of raw materials from primary industries, and includes the industries that produce a finished, tangible product.
 Construction – process that consists of the building or assembling of infrastructure, including buildings, roads, dams, etc.
 Manufacturing – process which involves tools and labor to produce goods for use or sale. Ranges from handicraft to high tech industrial production.

Tertiary sector 
 Tertiary sector – This group is involved in the provision of services. They include teachers, managers and other service providers.

Quaternary sector 
 Quaternary sector – the part of the economy that produces knowledge-based services.
 Information industry –
 Information generation and sharing –
 Information technology –
 Consulting services –
 Education –
 Research and development –
 Financial planning services –

Goals 
 Product
 Service

Productivity 
 Productivity
 Benchmarking
 Overall Equipment Effectiveness (OEE)
 Cost accounting
 Experience curve effects / Vocational education
 Operations research
 Scheduling and queuing theory
 Throughput accounting
 Time and motion study

History 
 History of industry
 Industrial Revolution
 History of manufacturing

Theories of production 
 Taylorism
 Fordism
 Theory of Constraints
 Toyotism (Lean manufacturing)

Economics 
 Factors of production
 Production theory basics
 Outline of industrial organization
 Production function
 Production possibility frontier

Manufacturing 
 Manufacturing
 Factory
 English system of manufacturing
 American system of manufacturing
 Scale of production
 Craft production
 Mass production
 Batch production
 Job production
 Just In Time manufacturing
 Toyota Production System 
 Lean production
 Computer-aided manufacturing (CAM)
 Mass customization

Product engineering 
 Product engineering
 Industrial and manufacturing engineering
 Reverse engineering
 Value engineering

Product design 
 Rapid prototyping
 Computer-aided design (CAD)
 New product development
 Research and development
 Toolkits for user innovation

Production technology 
 Industrial robot
 Computer-aided manufacturing
 Computer Integrated Manufacturing
 Production equipment control
 Computer numerically controlled
 Distributed Control System
 Fieldbus control system
 PLCs / PLD
 Advanced Planning & Scheduling
 Scheduling (production processes)
 SCADA supervisory control and data acquisition
 computerized maintenance management system (CMMS)
Packaging and labeling

Machinery 
 Machinery
 Production line
 Assembly line
 Conveyor belt
 Woodworking machinery
 Metalworking machinery
 Textile machinery
 Equipment manufacturer

Machine set-up 
 Changeover
 Single-Minute Exchange of Die (SMED)
 Sequence-dependent setup (mathematical)

Lot size and run length 
 Economic Lot Scheduling Problem
 Dynamic lot size model
 Economic order quantity
 Economic production quantity
 Economic batch quantity

Service provision 
Service economy
Service system
Service design

Logistics 
 Logistics
 Supply chain
 Supply chain management
 Procurement or purchasing
 Inventory
 Inventory management
 Reorder point
 Just In Time

Process improvement 
 Systems analysis
 Process modeling
 Process optimization
 Quality
 Quality control
 Six Sigma
 Total Quality Management
 Certification Processes and Awards
 ISO 9000
 Malcolm Baldrige National Quality Award (US)
 Canada Awards for Excellence (National Quality Institute) (Canada)
 Deming Prize (Japan)
 Joseph M. Juran Medal (US)
 Japan Quality Control Medal (Japan)

See also 
 Outline of industrial organization
 Assembly line
 Economics
 Fordism
 Means of production
 Mode of production
 Modernity
 Productivity model
 Outline of manufacturing
 Production theory basics
 Production possibility frontier
 Production function
 Computer-aided manufacturing
 Productive and unproductive labour
 Productive forces
 Productivity improving technologies (historical)
 Division of labour
 Mass production
 Second Industrial Revolution

References

External links 

 Productivity
Productivity and Costs – Bureau of Labor Statistics United States Department of Labor: contains international comparisons of productivity rates, historical and present
Productivity Statistics - Organisation for Economic Co-operation and Development
Greenspan Speech
OECD estimates of labour productivity levels
Productivity Enhancement Through Business Automation
Productivity Science - source for personal and business productivity information
Productivity Assessment Framework from Zinnov LLC

Production
Production
Production